The 2014 Monaco GP2 Series round was a pair of motor races held as part of the GP2 Series on 23 and 24 May 2014 at the Circuit de Monaco in Monte Carlo, Monaco. It was the third round of the 2014 GP2 Series and was run in support of the 2014 Monaco Grand Prix. The first event, a 40-lap feature race, was won by DAMS driver Jolyon Palmer who started from pole position. Mitch Evans finished second for Russian Time and Carlin's Felipe Nasr took third.  Palmer's teammate Stéphane Richelmi won the shorter 30-lap sprint race from second the following day, ahead of Trident driver Sergio Canamasas and Rio Haryanto of Caterham Racing.

Palmer won the pole position for the feature race by setting the fastest lap in qualifying but Evans made a brisk getaway to take the lead. Evans lost grip in his super soft compound tyres and Palmer overtook him for the lead at the start of lap 11. Palmer kept the lead for most of the remaining 29 laps to win the race with the first three finishers separated by six-tenths of a second. Richelmi started from pole position in the sprint race and held off Haryanto to lead into Sainte Devote. Richelmi withstood race-long pressure from Canamasas to achieve his maiden GP2 Series victory on his 54th attempt.

The results increased Palmer's advantage atop the Drivers' Championship to 46 points ober Nasr who gained second as a result of finishing second in the feature race. Johnny Cecotto Jr. passed Julián Leal, who scored no points in both races and fell to fourth. Arthur Pic was fifth with 40 points. DAMS now led the Teams' Championship with 135 points and Carlin were demoted to second with 30 less points. Trident and Campos were third and fourth with eight rounds left in the season.

Background

The 2014 Monaco GP2 Series round was the third of eleven scheduled events in 2014. It was held on 23 and 24 May 2014 at the Circuit de Monaco, Monte Carlo, Monaco and supported the 2014 Monaco Grand Prix. Tyre supplier Pirelli brought two types of tyre to the race: two dry compounds (red banded super-soft "options" and yellow-banded soft "primes"). There were 13 teams entering two drivers each for the round for a total of 26 competitors and all of them piloted the Dallara GP2/11 vehicle.

Before the round, DAMS driver Jolyon Palmer led the Drivers' Championship with 70 points, 22 ahead of Julián Leal in second, who was followed in turn, by a further six points behind third-placed Felipe Nasr. Johnny Cecotto Jr. was fourth on 29 points, and Arthur Pic was a further three points behind in fifth place. Carlin were leading the Teams' Championship with 90 points; their nearest rival DAMS stood seven points adrift in second place. ART Grand Prix were third with 33 points with Trident (29) and Campos (26) in fourth and fifth.

Practice and qualifying

One 45 minute morning practice session was held on Thursday afternoon. During the session, held in mixed and cold weather as rain swept through the area, Palmer lapped fastest with a time of 1 minute, 20.707 seconds, three-tenths of a second faster than Cecotto (Trident) in second. The rest of the top ten were Stéphane Richelmi (DAMS), Stefano Coletti (Racing Engineering), Mitch Evans (Russian Time), Sergio Canamasas (Trident), Rio Haryanto (Caterham Racing), Nasr, Leal (both Carlin) and Alexander Rossi (Caterham Racing). Nathanaël Berthon (Lazarus) crashed into the Anthony Noghes corner wall as he began his first quick lap. Canamasas locked his brakes going downhill and went onto a run-off area. He continued by reversing onto the track. Nasr was on a fast timed lap and stopped the session temporarily when he braked later than expected, became airborne driving over the Novelle chicane kerbs, and struck the outside barrier. Marshals were needed to move his damaged car from the barriers. As cars bunched up in the session's closing minutes, the front wing of Evans's car lodged itself in the rear of André Negrão's (Arden International) car in the track's final corners.

Friday afternoon's qualifying session ran for 30 minutes. Qualifying was divided into two groups of 13 cars, with odd numbered cars in Group A and even numbered vehicles in Group B. The drivers' fastest lap times determined the starting order for the first race. The pole position winner took four points towards the Drivers' and Teams' Championships. The track had mostly dried after rain affected the second practice session for the Monaco Grand Prix. Although a few minor damp patches were present, wet-weather tyres were not used by anybody but traffic was a factor due to the tight nature of the circuit. Palmer opted for a strategy to record his lap midway through qualifying for overall pole position with a benchmark lap of 1 minute, 20.774 seconds. Second place on the grid was originally Haryanto who set the best lap late in Group B and was nearly seven-tenths slower, but he was penalised with a three-place grid penalty for blocking other drivers during the session. Evans' team waited until he had clear space but was caught in traffic on his last lap on new tyres and took third. Richelmi followed his teammate Palmer's strategy and went faster on his last lap to go fourth. Two-time Monaco pole sitter Cecotto in fifth wore out his tyres and could not go faster.

Stoffel Vandoorne (ART Grand Prix) was another who improved and placed sixth. Daniel Abt (Hilmer Motorsport) was provisionally seventh and Racing Engineering teammates Coletti and Raffaele Marciello were eighth and ninth. Leal rounded out the top ten provisional qualifiers. Rossi in 11th was the fastest driver not to qualify in the top ten. Behind him, the rest of the provisional grid consisted of Canamasas, Simon Trummer (Rapax), Arthur Pic (Campos), Nasr, René Binder (Arden International), Kimiya Sato (Campos), Adrian Quaife-Hobbs (Rapax), Tio Ellinas (MP Motorsport), Facu Regalia (Hilmer Motorsport), Conor Daly (Lazarus), Daniël de Jong (MP Motorsport), Negrão, Berthon, Takuya Izawa (ART Grand Prix) and Artem Markelov (Russian Time). After qualifying, Abt was deemed to have impeded Cecotto and Negrão at two separate points of the track and incurred a three-place grid penalty that dropped him from seventh to tenth. Similarly, Haryanto, Regalia and Nasr were penalised for the same thing and Markelov was mandated to begin from the pit lane to take a grid penalty he received for causing a collision in the Catalunya sprint race.

Qualifying classification
Group A

Group B

Notes:
  — Daniel Abt, Rio Haryanto, Facu Regalia and Felipe Nasr were demoted three-places on the grid for blocking other drivers during qualifying.

Races

The first ten finishers scored points, with two given to the fastest lap holder. The grid for the second race was determined by the finishing order of the first but with the first eight drivers in reverse order of where they finished. The top eight finishers earned points towards their respective championships.

Feature race

On the grid, Palmer made a slow start on his soft compound tyres and lost the lead to Evans on the super soft compound into Sainte Devote turn. This was in contrast from the year before when a traffic jam brought the race to a halt. Palmer held off a challenge from his teammate Richelmi and the duo were followed by Cecotto, Vandoorne and Coletti. Nasr made the best start in the field, moving from 18th to 12th by the end of the first lap as Evans opened up a one-second advantage over Palmer at the same time. However, Evans was prevented from extending his lead further when the safety car was deployed at the beginning of lap two for Regalia who stopped on the inside at the exit of the Tabac corner with a drive train failure that began at the Novelle chicane. Evans maintained his lead at the lap four restart and Palmer retained second as the top six drivers began to pull away from Haryanto in seventh.

Further down the order, Nasr, Pic, Quaife-Hobbs, Canamasas and de Jong made their mandatory pit stops during laps seven and eight as they sought to move up the order through strategy. By this point, Evans lost grip due to worn tyres, allowing Palmer to gradually lower his lead. Palmer took the lead from Evans by turning right entering Sainte Devote corner at the start of the 11th lap. Palmer opened up a two-second lead over Evans before the lap was over. Evans' slow speed allowed Richelmi to close up and a small train of cars formed behind them as Cecotto was behind Richelmi. Abt retired at the Loews hairpin from contact with Rossi on lap 11. On the next lap, a multi-car crash at the Loews hairpin stopped the race. Binder tapped his teammate Negrão into a spin and blocked the entrance to the corner; he was stranded in the middle of the circuit and created a traffic jam. Markelov could not avoid Negrão and hit his car. Every driver returned to the grid and were permitted to change tyres; the order was rearranged to continue the race. This was despite the engines in some cars such as Rossi's and Richelmi's starting to overheat on the downhill approach to Mirabeau corner while stationary in traffic; their on-board computers went into safe mode. Marshals push started the affected cars down the tunnel and into the Novelle chicane.

The race started half an hour later behind the safety car and the race was run to time instead of laps. Palmer held the lead at the restart and set a series of fastest laps to open out a nine-second lead over Evans. Palmer's main concern, however, was Nasr who made his compulsory pit stop before the stoppage and he required a half a minute advantage over him. The safety car was dispatched for the second time on lap 25 after Leal mistimed an overtake on Marciello and lost control of his car, veering him into the tyre barrier at the exit of the Novelle chicane. Palmer and Evans immediately responded with their mandatory pit stops and emerged ahead of Nasr. Palmer avoided a penalty after he clipped a tyre designated for his teammate Richelmi on the way out of the DAMS pit stall. The tyre rolled down the pit lane and narrowly missed Cecotto's car. Vandoorne chose not to make a pit stop and led at the lap-28 restart with Palmer second. Coletti immediately pressured Canamasas and overtook him at La Racasse corner for sixth. On the next lap, he passed Nasr at the same turn. Coletti promptly overtook Evans and set after the yet-to-stop Trummer in third, who was on worn tyres.

Trummer defended from Coletti; as Coletti tried to overtake Trummer with an analogous move, the two made contact as Trummer turned in for Anthony Noghes turn. Both cars were sent straight into an outside barrier and retired on lap 32. On the lap, Izawa became the next retiree when he went into the wall at Mirbeau corner. In the meantime, Palmer regained the lead when Vandoorne made his mandatory pit stop on the lap and emerged outside of the top ten. Binder misjudged an overtake on Markelov that put Markelov out at the entry to the Novelle Chiane on lap 36. Binder then retired by going into a barrier at Tabac corner. Markelov's crash prompted course officials to wave yellow flags in and after the chicane. Palmer appeared he would win with a healthy lead but his soft compound tyres degraded in the closing laps. Evans subsequently drew nearer to Palmer but did not risk anything for the win as Nasr was close by and pressured him. The first three crossed the start/finish line after 40 laps covered by six-tenths of a second with Palmer winning, Evans second and Nasr third. Cecotto was a further second adrift in fourth, having held off Canamasas in fifth. Pic and Haryanto were sixth and seventh. Richelmi took eighth and the sprint race pole position. Quaife-Hobbs and Ellinas were ninth and tenth. The final classified finishers were de Jong, Marciello, Daly, Vandoorne, Sato, Rossi and Berthon.

Feature race classification
Drivers who scored championship points are denoted in bold.

Sprint race
After reviewing footage at the conclusion of the feature event, the stewards imposed a five-place grid penalty on Trummer causing the collision with Coletti and Binder incurred the same penalty for hitting Markelov. Richelmi and Haryanto got good starts off the line with the pair alongside each other into Sainte Devote corner. Haryanto was forced wide by Richelmi and lost momentum, allowing the fast-starting Canamasas to pass him at the exit of Sainte Devote corner. Canamasas focused on Richelmi as Haryanto began challenging him. On the opening lap, Markelov braked abruptly into Massenet corner and Ellinas could not avoid hitting the rear of his car. Markelov was issued a drive-through penalty for causing the incident, and Ellinas broke his front wing, necessitating multiple visits to the pit lane, putting him a lap behind Richelmi. Nasr then sustained a right-rear puncture at Casino Square turn. He locked his brakes and went straight onto a run-off area at Mirabeau corner to retire. 

Coletti made the best getaway in the field as he went from 19th to 13th by the end of the first lap. On lap three, Marciello earned a drive-through penalty after a driving error while trying to overtake de Jong pushed the latter into a barrier at the Loews hairpin. At the front, Richelmi could not pull away from Canamasas who was close by and pressured him; the two however pulled clear from the quartet of cars composed of Haryanto, Cecotto, Pic and Evans. Palmer was stuck in seventh, ahead of fellow British driver Quaife-Hobbs. Left-front braking problems on Izawa's car caused him to retire on lap 13. On the following lap, Markelov over-drove into Sainte Devote corner and dislodged a TecPro barrier at the exit of the turn. He littered debris on the track and stopped on the right into Beau Rivage turn. The safety car was deployed, reducing Richelmi and Canamasas' lead to nothing. The race restarted on lap 17. Richelmi held off Canamasas and Haryanto held off Cecotto for third. Richelmi and Canamasas distanced Haryanto soon after but the latter had a safe advantage over Cecotto.

Since pit stops were not required, and the weather was dry, it was now a question of who could preserve their tyres the best and whether anybody could overtake cars on degraded tyres. Canamasas out-braked himself for the entry to the Novelle chicane and ran straight across the corner. Canamasas stopped his car to prevent himself from gaining an unfair advantage and returned the lead to Richelmi. Richelmi's lead over Canamasas increased to one second for the first time all race. Although the deficit was soon reduced, Richelmi appeared that he would remain unchallenged. On his 54th attempt, it was Richelmi's maiden GP2 Series victory and DAMS' second consecutive win, repeating Coletti's triumph from the 2013 Monaco sprint race. Second-placed Canamasas was distanced by Richelmi more than two seconds in the final few laps and Haryanto followed four seconds later in third. Off the podium, Cecotto was two seconds slower and led a large close pack of cars in fourth. Pic, Evans, Palmer and Quaife-Hobbs rounded out the top eight. Coletti, Daly, Rossi, Berthon, Vandoorne, Sato, Negrão, Leal, Abt, Trummer, Marciello, Binder, Regalia and Ellinas were the final classified finishers.

Sprint race classification
Drivers who scored championship points are denoted in bold.

Notes:
 — Simon Trummer and René Binder were demoted five places on the grid after being deemed by the stewards to have caused collisions with Stefano Coletti and Artem Markelov, respectively.

Post-round
The top three drivers in both races appeared on the podium to collect their trophies and in separate press conferences. Palmer said he was unworried about Evans starting on the soft compound tyre and spoke of the importance of passing him after the race stoppage as everybody was on the same strategy. He stated he was frustrated about losing his nine-second lead because of the stoppage, "I was feeling comfortable in the car. The pace was the same as yesterday really. We were very strong." Second-placed Evans said he began on the super soft tyres because he felt it was right decision at the time, "The first two laps were good. I was feeling good in the car. After the safety car, the prime came into play more and the option dropped a lot and my front tyres started to go away. I just really started to struggle. I was trying to hang in there until our target for pit stop." Nasr stated his team put him on an alternative strategy and revealed a slower car delayed him during the pit stops, stopping him from challenging Evans. Nevertheless, he was happy to finish third, "Coming from P18 on the grid it was a great race today. We showed our pace and we showed what we’re here for."

After the sprint race, Richelmi commented he was happy to win and emphasised the need to conserve tyre life around Monaco despite degradation not being a major factor, "I cannot find my words…! We were so disappointed yesterday after the pit stop incident, but it’s like this. It’s racing. For sure, I lost the podium there. Now it’s just amazing to win in front of my friends. It’s really exciting and now I want to take the time to realise what happen and enjoy." Canamasas said he was happy to achieve his first GP2 Series podium and believed it was better to remain calm in the final third of the lap after observing Coletti's and Trummer's feature race crash, "I’m proud of what we did and I think they’ve done a very good job. We got a good start and I was second in the first corner. I tried to push Stéphane for the win, but this second place is already an amazing result." Haryanto said he did all he could to get on the front row and aimed to duel for the win, "I tried my best at the start to get Stéphane but it was really close going into the first corner. Unfortunately, I got a little bit wide to the exit and Canamasas went through. Anyway, third is not a bad place to finish especially here in Monaco."

Due to the result of the round, Palmer extended his lead atop the Drivers' Championship to 46 points from Nasr who moved to second after his feature race result. Cecotto moved to third with 49 points and was one point ahead of the non-scoring Leal in fourth. Pic retained fifth place with 40 points. DAMS took the lead of the Teams' Championship Carlin by 30 points. Trident's results moved them to third with 71 points. Campos took over fourth place with 40 points as ART Grand Prix scored no points in both races and fell to fifth with eight rounds left in the season.

Standings after the race

Drivers' Championship standings

Teams' Championship standings

 Note: Only the top five positions are included for both sets of standings.

References

External links

Monaco
GP2
Motorsport in Monaco